Guilty Pleasures is a 1993 horror and mystery novel by American writer Laurell K. Hamilton. It is the first book in the  Anita Blake: Vampire Hunter series. Guilty Pleasures introduces the character of Anita Blake, a vampire hunter and necromancer, who works in an alternate universe where magic, vampires, werewolves and other supernatural elements exist. The novel blends elements of supernatural and hardboiled detective fiction.

Plot summary
In Guilty Pleasures, Anita Blake is blackmailed by Nikolaos, the vampire master of the city, into investigating a series of vampire murders.  During the course of this investigation, Anita begins her relationship with Jean-Claude, another master vampire, and receives two of the four marks necessary to make her Jean-Claude's "human servant."  Ultimately, Anita identifies the murderer, but by that point has sufficiently antagonized Nikolaos and her underlings that she is forced to confront them.  Ultimately, with help from Jean-Claude and Edward, a human associate who specializes in assassinating supernatural targets, Anita kills Nikolaos and many of her followers, making Jean-Claude master of the city.

Adaptations
On October 20, 2006 a twelve issue comic book adaptation of Guilty Pleasures began, published by Marvel Comics and Dabel Brothers Productions. The set was collected into two volumes starting in 2007, with a complete edition releasing in 2009.

Reception
The Celebrity Cafe gave the book a positive review, calling it "engaging".

Main characters

 Anita Blake
 Nikolaos
 Jean-Claude
 Edward
 Phillip

References

1993 American novels
American erotic novels
Anita Blake: Vampire Hunter novels
Low fantasy novels
Novels set in St. Louis
Urban fantasy novels
Ace Books books
Novels adapted into comics